Confederación Nacional Obrera de Cuba (National Workers Confederation of Cuba) was a Cuban trade union confederation. It was founded in Camagüey in the 1920s by Alfredo López. CNOC led several labour struggles during its existence, such as the general strike during Machado's government in 1933. In 1939 CNOC was dissolved, and substituted by Confederación de Trabajadores de Cuba.

References

Trade unions in Cuba

Trade unions established in the 1920s
Popular Socialist Party (Cuba)